Toa Maru No 2 is a World War II Japanese transport ship sunk by the American submarine  off Gizo, Solomon Islands on 25 November 1943.

Diving destination
The hull of the wreck is intact and lying on its starboard side. The ships masts are still attached to the hull; however, recently the superstructure has fallen into the sand. The contents of the ship's six cargo holds include sake bottles, ammunition magazines, two Type 95 tanks, motor-cycle sidecar combinations, and a fuel tanker. However, since the sinking, the ship has been salvaged removing some of the cargo and the ship's propeller.

In its 2010 travel guide, Diver magazine named the wreck as one of the top 20 wreck dives in the world.

External links

Footnotes

Ships sunk by American submarines
World War II shipwrecks in the Pacific Ocean
Maritime incidents in November 1943
Gizo, Solomon Islands
Wreck diving sites